Vaihei Samin (born 15 September 2001) is a Tahitian footballer who plays as a forward for the Tahiti women's national team.

Samin is the daughter of former Tahiti goalkeeper Xavier Samin and the granddaughter of women's football pioneer Leila Marmouyet. She has played football since she was seven years old. In Tahiti she played for A.S. Tefana.

In 2017 she travelled to France to seek selection with a French team, and was recruited by the Tours hope centre. In 2019 she joined Division 1 Féminine team Fleury.

She was selected for the Tahiti women's national team for the 2019 Pacific Games in Apia, Samoa. She declined selection for the 2022 OFC Women's Nations Cup in order to focus on her career in France.

References

2001 births
Living people
People from Papeete
French Polynesian women's footballers
Women's association football forwards
Tahiti women's international footballers
FC Fleury 91 (women) players